Whale ( / Kit) is a 1970 Bulgarian satirical comedy film directed by Petar B. Vasilev and written by Cheremuhin. The film stars Georgi Kaloyanchev, Dimitar Panov, Georgi Partsalev, Grigor Vachkov and Tsvyatko Nikolov.

This film had one of the most scandalous and at the same time mythological destinies in the history of Bulgarian cinema. It was filmed in 1967 but not released until 1970 when it was shown at a few small cinema halls in an edition that had been expurgated by the communist authorities. Whale satirizes the extant defects in the economic and social structure of the state in those years. Moreover, the film unambiguously specifies the exact carriers of the negative effects. The target is the bureaucratic pathos at the different ruling levels. The pathos by means of which various data and information are manipulated in the name of non-existing achievements.

In the film was born one of the most popular quotes in the Bulgarian cinema:

Plot
A small fishing ship after an unsuccessful quest for some draught got not more than a single fish on top of everything the smallest one -  a sprat. Despite the miserable catch the captain (Vachkov) reports through the transmitter to the superior of the fishing base Petrov (Nikolov). Of course he mentions a bigger species of fish and doesn't particularize the quantity. After months without any production from the enterprise, the superior of the base in his turn reports personally to the big local boss Kalcho Kalchev (Panov). One more time the species are enlarged and even the presence of a considerable shoal is entangled. Sitting to the table the two men have a drink or two of some cognac to celebrate the occasion. They don't stop and decide to specify the catch as a draught of dolphins as more massy kind of sea creature.
Being in private later the local boss has a colourful monologue with the portrait on the wall portraying the minister Parushev (Kaloyanchev) of the field they work in. Finally the Kalchev's right hand - the lead engineer (Partsalev) insinuate that the dolphin, as a matter of fact, is actually a kind of an whale.

So one sunny day in the head department in the capital the message is received - "... We got an whale ...". The state employees can't wait to inform the minister. Naturally he spends his days in the nice villa around the city. The pathos spread to all of them. In a fit of euphoria Parushev proposes a new name of their state department - The Ministry of Whales. The ideas of some whales festival are born even a whaling flotilla is mentioned. Leading the procession Parushev, Kalchev and all of the involved are formed up at the pier to welcome the inbound ship. The festive meeting of the bewildered fishermen is the culmination of the bureaucratic farce.

Production

The Idea

In the beginning of the 1950s the screenwriter Hristo Mihov, nicknamed Cheremuhin, followed his wife in the town of Aitos where she was allocated as a doctor. The town is not far from the seaside so Cheremuhin heard many maritime stories. Once, one of the locals told him a story about a fisherman who caught some sprats but boasted that it were mackerels. Every time when the story was told and the fish became bigger and bigger until in the end it was a story about a shark. The people then replied that there are no sharks in this sea. But the fisherman said: "... How do you know, I has even saw an whale out there ...". Mihov undertook a ten days sailing amidst the fishermen so that he could learn the terminology and details. Afterwards he sat behind the typewriter and in the 1955 the short novel was completed.

Screenplay and filming
When Cheremuhin and his wife returned to Sofia he met his acquaintance Anzhel Vagenshtain. Being a manager of the screenwriters committee Vagenshtain immediately realized the potentiality of the novel. In his turn he introduced Mihov to the director Petar B. Vasilev. Vasilev, with the forthcoming fame as a director of The Past-Master, and Cheremuhin retired in the ex-royal residence Sitnyakovo which was turned into the Writer's Union base. In two months the screenplay was completed.

The maritime scenes were filmed in Sozopol. The work progressed in a friendly and cheerful atmosphere. There was some talk that Grigor Vachkov gave many ideas about the funny cues in some episodes. Other parts were filmed in the Cinema Center near the Sofia suburb Boyana. There was situated the villa of the minister Parushev.

The song that was sung by the state employees while going to the Parushev's villa was composed by Atanas Boyadzhiev. The lyric was by the poet Plamen Tsonev:

This song became a hit but the censorship came after instead of some gala premiere.

Censorship

Shortly after the Whale was filmed in 1967, the eastern Europe was shaken by the doings around the Prague Spring. So it was a very delicate moment. Of course in the direction of the Bulgarian Communist Party, which forcibly took the monocracy in the country, were aware of the bitting satire of the communist economic model represented in the film. Moreover, the authorities noticed even an allusion between the character of Parushev (Kaloyanchev) and the leader of the Bulgarian communists and President of the Republic of that time Todor Zhivkov. It was also perceived some relation between the character of Kalcho Kalchev (Panov) and Stanko Todorov another communist leader. In the film Kalchev is the general executive of the local enterprise. But before that it became clear that he was simply a hatter. As a matter of fact Stanko Todorov was a tailor in his youth.

The director Vasilev and the cinematographer Emil Vagenshtain bravely struggled with the censoring. The reel stayed more than a two years in the basement stores. At that time the big scandal with some local communist leader burst out in the country. He reported a great crop of wheat for what he was awarded. Subsequently, it turned out that the crop was below the average.

On top of everything the screenwriter's brother emigrated to USA. He was a nuclear physicist and after a specialization in France he left for North America instead of returning to Bulgaria.
The appearance of Radoy Ralin in an episode as an ichthyologist also added oil to the flames. Being famous writer satirist and a poet he was also a well known dissident during the communist regime.

Finally the film was released but at first in only two cinema halls in the city of Plovdiv. Even without any advertisement the tickets are sold out. Afterwards Whale was shown in the small Levski cinema in the capital of Sofia again with no preliminary announcement. There were cues and frames missing even the whole episodes were cut off.

The non censored edition was released on DVD in 2000s.

Cast
The film features eminent Bulgarian comic actors. Kaloyanchev, Panov and Partsalev are in theirs best. Unfortunately Whale is the last film for the Tsvyatko Nikolov. He died shortly when the film was released in 1970. In some episodes we can see the director Vasilev's wife the actress Valentina Borisova. The acting of the memorable Grigor Vachkov should be also pointed out. It is known that one of the fishermen in the ship around Vachkov was his wife's brother in the real life.

Response
A reported 599,350 admissions were recorded for the film in cinemas throughout Bulgaria. Taking into consideration that, because of the censorship, it was released in small cinema halls with no advertisement the film Whale attracted considerable audience.

After the liberation in 1989/90 the film was at first broadcast on the Bulgarian National Television. Naturally, it gave rise to a broad interest and took his due place among the Bulgarian notable films of those years. Subsequently, during the 2000s, it was released on DVD.

The film was subsumed among the 50 golden Bulgarian films in the book by the journalist Pencho Kovachev. The book was published in 2008 by "Zahariy Stoyanov" publishing house.

Notes

References
 The film in the Bulgarian National Television 
 Pencho Kovachev, 50 Golden Bulgarian Films, Zahariy Stoyanov 2008

External links
 

1970s Bulgarian-language films
Bulgarian satirical films
Films set in Bulgaria
Films shot in Bulgaria
Films about whaling
Films about whales
1970 films
Films directed by Petar B. Vasilev